Barrett James Ruud (born May 20, 1983) is a former American football linebacker in the National Football League (NFL). He was drafted by the Tampa Bay Buccaneers in the second round of the 2005 NFL Draft and also played for the Tennessee Titans, New Orleans Saints and Houston Texans. He played college football at Nebraska, where he was let go as the inside linebackers coach in 2023.

Early years
Ruud attended high school at Lincoln Southeast High School in Lincoln, Nebraska. He was a four-year letterman and a two-time all-state honorable mention selection in basketball. 
He helped his team compile a 48–2 record and Class A state titles in 1998, 1999, and 2001. He was a two-time All-American by the Omaha World-Herald and earned All-American honors as a linebacker from Prep Star and Student Sport. 
Ruud also played halfback and set school career records with 2,988 rushing yards and 54 touchdowns.
He also was a two-time super-state pick and was named offensive player of the year, defensive player of the year and prep athlete of the year by the Lincoln Journal Star.

College career
Ruud played college football at the University of Nebraska becoming a third-generation Husker football player in the process. He earned numerous honors while there including 2004 Third-team All American, 2004 First-team All-Big 12, 2003 Second-team All-Big 12, and 2002 All-Big 12 honorable mention among others. He finished his career starting 37 of 50 games finishing with a school record 432 career tackles.

Professional career

Tampa Bay Buccaneers
Ruud was drafted by the Tampa Bay Buccaneers in the second round of the 2005 NFL Draft. As a rookie, he played in all 16 games recording 17 tackles. In 2006, he started 5 of 16 games after injuries to Shelton Quarles and Ryan Nece and finished with 57 tackles.

In 2007 Ruud became a full-time starter after the team cut longtime starter Quarles. He finished the season starting all 15 games he played in, recording 114 tackles and two interceptions. He remained the Buccaneers starter through 2008 and ended the season totaling 137 tackles, three sacks and two interceptions.

Tennessee Titans
On July 30, 2011, Ruud signed with the Tennessee Titans. On December 13, 2011, Ruud was placed on injured reserve, ending his season.

Seattle Seahawks
In April 2012, Ruud signed with the Seattle Seahawks.

New Orleans Saints
On August 20, 2012, Ruud was traded to the New Orleans Saints in exchange for a conditional draft pick. On October 8, 2012, Ruud was cut by the Saints after the team went through a 1-4 start.

Houston Texans
On October 10, 2012 Ruud was signed by the Houston Texans, to provide depth at linebacker after the injury to defensive star Brian Cushing.

NFL statistics

Personal life
Ruud's father, Tom Ruud, played for the Cornhuskers in the early 1970s and later in the National Football League for the Buffalo Bills and Cincinnati Bengals. His younger brother Bo also attended Nebraska.

His mother Jaime Ruud died of a massive heart attack on June 30, 2006 while vacationing with family in northern Minnesota.

Barrett hosts an annual summer football camp at Warner University for children ages 7–18.

References

External links
 Nebraska profile
 Seattle Seahawks profile

1983 births
Living people
American football linebackers
Houston Texans players
Nebraska Cornhuskers football coaches
Nebraska Cornhuskers football players
New Orleans Saints players
Seattle Seahawks players
Tampa Bay Buccaneers players
Tennessee Titans players
UCF Knights football coaches
Sportspeople from Lincoln, Nebraska
Players of American football from Nebraska